Cumbia Ninja is a Colombian drama, mystery and science fiction television series broadcast by FOX Channel. It was created by Andrés Gelós and is based on the Aztecs' culture. It broadcast in Colombia from September 5, 2013 to December 17, 2015. The series stars Ricardo Abarca and Brenda Asnicar.

On August 29, 2013, for the first season, Fox green lighted 13 episodes. The series got generally favorable comments from the press and the public, and got renewed for two more seasons. The second season premiered on October 2, 2014 and ended on April 30, 2015. On October 29, 2015, the third and last season of the series premiered.

Plot 
The series tells the story of Juana Carbajal and Nicolás "Hache" Acuña, two kids with completely different lives in many ways, but destiny will bring them together. After living tragic moments in their lives, such as the loss of important people for both, they are chosen by Sungaku, an ancient God of the Mesoamerican civilization and the Aztec culture, to protect the important legacy and secrets about their culture, and discover the true meaning of life, as both must face and overcome various types of problems.

Season 1 
Juana Carbajal (Brenda Asnicar) is a rich teenager and daughter of the important businessman Víctor Carbajal (Juan Pablo Gamboa). She is a girl who has led a life of money and without needs, including an overprotective mom and two younger siblings. But when her family is killed by hit men from her own uncle, León Carbajal (Rubén Zamora), she must live with her nanny Elba Paez (Helena Mallarino), the only survivor of the massacre, changing her name to Nieves and her image completely, to look like a street teenager. Nicolás "Hache" Acuña (Ricardo Abarca) is a young man with the dream of being a singer who lives in "La Colina", a humble and troubled neighborhood. Hache is discovered by Willy Vega (Christian Meier), a famous manager, during the concert of the band "The Pin-Piranhas" and decides to become the great leader of a new band called : "Cumbia Ninja", which would replace the band by having these are a serious accident. The members of the band are : Chopín, the keyboardist ; Bitbox, the bassist ; Karate, the guitarist ; and Tumba, the drummer ; Hache, being the vocalist. During the band's first concert, the murder of the Carbajal and Chico family, Hache's brother and gang leader "El Cruce" occurred, so Hache must assume the role of gang leader, but this in turn He is on his mission to lead his new musical band and it is difficult for him. His first song in honor of his little brother, made him wake up, Sungaku, an ancient god, after a thousand years of remaining asleep under the ancient Chinese house of La Colina, where the roads of Juana and Hache come together, being born between them What will be a great love. Nieves infiltrates the house of León Carbajal, to find evidence against him about murdering his family and Hache, meanwhile, rivals the leader of the enemy gang, Salmón, who suspects it has something to do with death his brother's.

Nieves is discovered by Ítalo (Albi De Abreu), a trusted man from León, who falls in love with her. It, upon discovering the relationship between Nieves and Hache, decides to obtain Nieves at all costs, thus meaning the death of several people on his part. Salmon, his girlfriend Talita and his partner Jhon Alex, discover the secret under the ancient Chinese house of Xiang Wu (Victor Jimenez), the teacher, guide and mentor of the "Cumbia Ninja" and caretaker of Sungaku. After several events, Nieves decides to leave Hache to leave with Italo, who convinces her to go by telling her that she has dying and locked up her best friend, Úrsula (Estefanía Godoy), leaving Hache with a broken heart. The master Wu finally makes the "Cumbia Ninja" know Sungaku, telling him that problems are coming and that they must protect the dragon with their lives, it is a secret that does not have to fall into the wrong ears.

Season 2 
León Carbajal, the villain of history, will seek along with Itha the secret of El Dorado to become richer and in turn take revenge on La Colina. Juana, to save her best friend Úrsula from the clutches of Itha, will have to reveal her true identity and at the same time pretend she lost her memory. This causes Hache to begin to doubt Juana and wonder if it was true what they lived. Juana has to live with her uncle Leon but she is still looking for evidence that incriminates him as the murderer of her family, which will also serve later to obtain answers about Chico's death. The boys of "Cumbia Ninja" will have a new manager, Felix Villalba (Miguel Rodarte), who will replace Willy with this one leaving with Úrsula away from Itha. But Felix has a double personality and a dark secret that only tries to sink the band. Sungaku teaches the Ninja Cumbia the "Five Impossible Hits", which they will have to use against the enemy. Joan will face a fight between the thirst for revenge and her heart. Hache will lead "El Cruce" more than ever and finally end "Los 2200" once and for all, mainly with Salmon and find out that Juana never lost her memory and that he has always remained in his mind and that he loves him. He also learns about the relationship between the death of Chico and Juana's family, mainly with his father, Víctor Carbajal. Jhon Alex (Juan Diego Sanchez) will die betrayed by Talita, who proclaims herself as the owner of "La Colina", but Carmenza, reaped by the fury and suffering of knowing that Talita killed her son Chico, will put an end to the leader from "The 2200." The remaining gang members of the bands "Domix" and "2200" will make a peace deal and join "El Cruce", and help Hache to give his final battle against Italo, who has kidnapped Juana. During the day of the "Battle of the Bands" program, the Cumbia Ninja are disqualified when they encounter a major problem : Leon finds the pyramid, but falls into the ambush of Juana and Hache, who with Sungaku, will get Leon to receive his deserved punishment , while the Cumbia Ninja give a great recital in "La Cima", with the rival band, "Globulina". Finally, Leon is arrested, Juana and Hache distance themselves again, while Felix begins to prepare his revenge against Sungaku.

Season 3 
After a year of Chico's death, La Colina is at peace. Cumbia Ninja return as great idols of music, now counting on Jessica (Natalia Reyes) as a member of the band after Bitbox left. Hache still feels that the neighborhood, the band and especially Sungaku still expect more from him. But since he let Juana go, nothing matters, not even music. Hache feels responsible for everything that has been going on. In turn, Juana also did not get the peace she expected. His passing through La Colina left her broken inside and returning to her previous life is not enough. Without love and without a vengeance that drives her to move on, Juana is lost in the excesses of a rich heiress, endangering her life. Juana is in a stage of much self-destruction and in an identity crisis, but finally she will find a guide, someone who will help her move forward: Felix, who will advise her to continue with revenge for the death of her family, Making him believe that the culprit of everything was not Leon, but Sungaku's secret, Leon will rot in jail until Balam's power will help him be respected there. It finally awakens, after being helped by Felix and will seek revenge on the Cumbia Ninja. Now a hidden power appears from the shadows and both come to discover the truth of the mysterious force that caused tragic events in La Colina and the Carbajal family, the force that makes them adversaries. Felix will train Juana with the power of the Jaguar to make her his successor. In turn, Xiang Wu will train Hache with the power of the Dragon for the next battle. Leon will have his due and will be killed in jail after betraying Balam. It will be revealed that Felix is actually Sungaku's ancestral enemy, the Jaguar.

Balam persuades Juana to end Hache because he possesses the power of the Dragon, during the final fight Juana hopes to die at the hands of the Dragon to be released, Hache refuses to hurt Juana, therefore, Juana is dropped by the bridge where they are, Hache follows it and when the impact falls together, it affects all the characters, who lose their powers granted by The Dragon, the power of The Jaguar and The Dragon leaves their bodies thanks to Balam who on them pronounces prayers invoking the battle that really is a dance between both powers, Balam tries to possess them, when he is about to achieve it, Italo stabs him in the back and murders him, the powers disappear, Juana and Hache wake up after the impact without any power, outside of The Hill is waiting for you by the police informing you that the Carbajal family case is finally closed, the police take it to Italo. Everything ends well between Juana and Hache, who travel together to find peace and prepare to be the successor of the Dragon and spread the ashes of Xiang Wu, they saying him goodbay and then embark on a journey where the wind takes them.

Cast

Main 

 Ricardo Abarca in the role of Nicolás "Hache" Acuña.
 Brenda Asnicar in the role of Juana Carbajal / Nieves.
 Nicolás Rincón in the role of Chopín.
 Sebastian Rendón in the role of Carlos "Karate" Wu.
 Julio Nava in the role of Camilo "Tumba" Paez.
 Ignacio Meneses in the role of Bitbox. (S1 and S2) 
 Ruddy Rodriguez in the role of Carmenza Acuña.
 Víctor Jiménez in the role of Xiang Wu.
 Rubén Zamora in the role of León Carbajal.
 Carla Giraldo in the role of Talita. (S1 and S2)
 Juan Diego Sanchez in the role of John Alex (S1 and S2)
 Albi De Abreu in the role of Italo.
 Miguel Rodarte in the role of Félix Villalba / Sr. Balam. (S1 and S2)
 René Figueroa in the role of El Dragón Sungaku (voice).

Series overview 

{| class="wikitable plainrowheaders" style="text-align:center;"
|-
! scope="col" colspan="2" rowspan="2" style="padding: 0px 8px" |Series
! scope="col" rowspan="2" style="padding: 0px 8px" |Episodes
! scope="col" colspan="2" style="padding: 1px 8px" |Originally aired
|-
! scope="col" style="padding: 1px 8px" | Series premiere
! scope="col" style="padding: 1px 8px" | Series finale
|-
| height="10" bgcolor="#004fc5" scope="row" | 
| [[List of H2O: Just Add Water episodes#Series one (2006)|1]]
| 13
| 
| 
|-
| height="10" bgcolor="#00aaff" scope="row" | 
| [[List of H2O: Just Add Water episodes#Series two (2007–08)|2]]
| 16
| 
| 
|-
| height="10" bgcolor="#00ffff" scope="row" | 
| [[List of H2O: Just Add Water episodes#Series three (2009–10)|3]]
| 16
|  
|  
|}

Production

Development
In January 2015, Fox announced the cast of the series including actors Brenda Asnicar and Ricardo Abarca were. The first season series premiered on September 5, 2013, and ended on November 28, 2013, with 13 episodes aired on Thursdays. In a prinicipio it was scheduled only 13 episodes. But due to the success, Fox decided to renew the series for a second season.

Cumbia Ninja is the first scripted original series on FOX. The series creator and showrunner Andrés Gelós, who also directed the pilot and other episodes.

The first part of the second season began on October 2, 2014, and ended on November 20, 2014, with eight episodes aired. The second part was scheduled to begin on January 22, 2015, until March 19, 2015. But according to Fox, there was a change of plans and then announced that the second part aired from March 2015.

On December 3, 2014, Fox confirmed the third season of the series and began filming on January 15, 2015. The third season premiered on October 29, 2015, and ended on December 17, 2015.

References

External links

Colombian drama television series
Ninja fiction
Fantasy television series
Mystery television series
Serial drama television series
Television series about teenagers
Television shows based on short fiction
Television series by 20th Century Fox Television
Historical television series
Witchcraft in television
Nonlinear narrative television series